Wojciech Piotr Piecha (born 13 February 1958) is a Polish politician. He was elected to the Senate of Poland (10th term) representing the constituency of Bielsko-Biała. He was also elected to the 9th term (2015–2019) of the Senate of Poland.

References 

Living people
1958 births
Place of birth missing (living people)
20th-century Polish politicians
21st-century Polish politicians
Members of the Senate of Poland 2015–2019
Members of the Senate of Poland 2019–2023